Yukarıyeniköy is a village in the Refahiye District of Erzincan Province in Turkey.

The founders of the village came from Central Asia and settled in the Değirmendere region, north of the current Damlaca village. An arrow was shot to resolve the dispute with the villagers of Damlaca. The branches of the tree hit by the arrow were pruned, the settlements were separated and the village was renamed Yukarıyeniköy. The old name of the village is mentioned as Yeniköy in the 1916 records. The village, which was connected to the district of Suşehri in Sivas, is now connected to Refahiye, which is 15 kilometers away. Village people earn their living from agriculture and livestock. The majority of the village people work in various jobs in Istanbul. These people return to the village to spend their summer vacation.

The village is approximately 86 km away from Erzincan Province. It is located within Black Sea Region borders.

References

Villages in Refahiye District